The Frisians are a Germanic ethnic group indigenous to the coastal regions of the Netherlands and northwestern Germany. They inhabit an area known as Frisia and are concentrated in the Dutch provinces of Friesland and Groningen and, in Germany, East Frisia and North Frisia (which was a part of Denmark until 1864). The name is probably derived from frisselje (to braid, thus referring to braided hair). The Frisian languages are spoken by more than 500,000 people; West Frisian is officially recognised in the Netherlands (in Friesland), and North Frisian and Saterland Frisian are recognised as regional languages in Germany.

History
The ancient Frisii enter recorded history in the Roman account of Drusus's 12 BC war against the Rhine Germans and the Chauci. They occasionally appear in the accounts of Roman wars against the Germanic tribes of the region, up to and including the Revolt of the Batavi around 70 AD. Frisian mercenaries were hired to assist the Roman invasion of Britain in the capacity of cavalry. They are not mentioned again until  296, when they were deported into Roman territory as laeti (i.e., Roman-era serfs; see Binchester Roman Fort and Cuneus Frisionum). The discovery of a type of earthenware unique to fourth century Frisia, called terp Tritzum, shows that an unknown number of them were resettled in Flanders and Kent, probably as laeti under Roman coercion.

From the third through the fifth centuries Frisia suffered marine transgressions that made most of the land uninhabitable, aggravated by a change to a cooler and wetter climate. Whatever population may have remained dropped dramatically, and the coastal lands remained largely unpopulated for the next two centuries. When conditions improved, Frisia received an influx of new settlers, mostly Angles and Saxons. These people would eventually be referred to as 'Frisians', though they were not necessarily descended from the ancient Frisii. It is these 'new Frisians' who are largely the ancestors of the medieval and modern Frisians.

By the end of the sixth century, Frisian territory had expanded westward to the North Sea coast and, in the seventh century, southward down to Dorestad. This farthest extent of Frisian territory is sometimes referred to as Frisia Magna. Early Frisia was ruled by a High King, with the earliest reference to a 'Frisian King' being dated 678.

In the early eighth century the Frisian nobles came into increasing conflict with the Franks to their south, resulting in a series of wars in which the Frankish Empire eventually subjugated Frisia in 734. These wars benefited attempts by Anglo-Irish missionaries (which had begun with Saint Boniface) to convert the Frisian populace to Christianity, in which Saint Willibrord largely succeeded.

Some time after the death of Charlemagne, the Frisian territories were in theory under the control of the Count of Holland, but in practice the Hollandic counts, starting with Count Arnulf in 993, were unable to assert themselves as the sovereign lords of Frisia. The resulting stalemate resulted in a period of time called the 'Frisian freedom', a period in which feudalism and serfdom (as well as central or judicial administration) did not exist, and in which the Frisian lands only owed their allegiance to the Holy Roman Emperor.

During the 13th century, however, the counts of Holland became increasingly powerful and, starting in 1272, sought to reassert themselves as rightful lords of the Frisian lands in a series of wars, which (with a series of lengthy interruptions) ended in 1422 with the Hollandic conquest of Western Frisia and with the establishment of a more powerful noble class in Central and Eastern Frisia.

In 1524, Frisia became part of the Seventeen Provinces and in 1568 joined the Dutch revolt against Philip II, king of Spain, heir of the Burgundian territories; Central Frisia has remained a part of the Netherlands ever since. The eastern periphery of Frisia would become part of various German states (later Germany) and Denmark. An old tradition existed in the region of exploitation of peatlands.

Migration to England and Scotland

Though it is impossible to know exact numbers and migration patterns, research has indicated that many Frisians were part of the wave of ethnic groups to colonise areas of present-day England alongside the Angles, Saxons and Jutes, starting from around the fifth century when Frisians arrived along the coastline of Kent.

Frisians principally settled in modern-day Kent, East Anglia, the East Midlands, North East England, and Yorkshire. Across these areas, evidence of their settlement includes place names of Frisian origin, such as Frizinghall in Bradford and Frieston in Lincolnshire.

Similarities in dialect between Great Yarmouth and Friesland have been noted, originating from trade between these areas during the Middle Ages. Frisians are also known to have founded the Freston area of Ipswich.

In Scotland, historians have noted that colonies of Angles and Frisians settled as far north as the River Forth. This corresponds to those areas of Scotland which historically constituted part of Northumbria.

Frisians in Denmark 
The earliest traces of Frisians in modern-day Denmark date back to the 11th century when Frisians settled around Tøndermarsken west of Tønder. The evidence for this are the Warften (værfter) in the area that are built after the same method as the ones alongside the Wadden Sea towards the Netherlands. They have also been found in Ribe.

In 1637, chronicler  wrote that the Frisian newcomers learned the Danish language but did not become Danish, holding on to Frisian language, custom, manners, working methods and so on.

In modern times, Frisian culture in Denmark is described as assimilated and most do not consider themselves Frisian. In regards to the Frisian language, very few may speak it as first language but it was traditionally spoken in few polder hamlets near the border to Germany. One estimate puts the Frisian population in Denmark somewhere between 2,000 and 5,000.

Language 
As both the Anglo-Saxons of England and the early Frisians were formed from similar tribal confederacies, their respective languages were very similar, together forming the Anglo-Frisian family. Old Frisian is the most closely related language to Old English and the modern Frisian dialects are in turn the closest related languages to contemporary English that do not themselves derive from Old English (although the modern Frisian and English are not mutually intelligible).

The Frisian language group is divided into three mutually unintelligible languages:
West Frisian, spoken in the Dutch province of Friesland
Saterland Frisian, spoken in the German municipality of Saterland just south of East Frisia
North Frisian, spoken in the German region of North Frisia (within the Kreis of Nordfriesland) on the west coast of Jutland.

Of these three languages both Saterland Frisian (2,000 speakers) and North Frisian (10,000 speakers) are endangered. West Frisian is spoken by around 350,000 native speakers in Friesland, and as many as 470,000 when including speakers in neighbouring Groningen province. West Frisian is not listed as threatened, although research published by Radboud University in 2016 has challenged that assumption.

Identity

Today there exists a tripartite division, of North, East and West Frisians, caused by Frisia's continual loss of territory in the Middle Ages. The West Frisians, in general, do not see themselves as part of a larger group of Frisians, and, according to a 1970 poll, identify themselves more with the Dutch than with the East or North Frisians. Therefore, the term 'Frisian', when applied to the speakers of all three Frisian languages, is a linguistic, ethnic and/or cultural concept, not a political one.

See also
Anglo-Frisian languages
Frisian Americans
Frisian church in Rome
Frisian Islands
Frisian languages
East Frisian (Saterland Frisian)
North Frisian
West Frisian
Friso-Saxon dialects
East Frisian Low Saxon
Gronings
Stellingwarfs
Ingvaeonic languages
List of Frisians
List of Germanic tribes

References

Works cited

Further reading
 Greg Woolf, "Cruptorix and his kind. Talking ethnicity on the middle ground", Ton Derks, Nico Roymans (ed.), Ethnic Constructs in Antiquity: The Role of Power and Tradition (Amsterdam: Amsterdam University Press, 2009) (Amsterdam Archaeological Studies, 13), 207–218.
 Jos Bazelmans, "The early-medieval use of ethnic names from classical antiquity. The case of the Frisians", in Ton Derks, Nico Roymans (ed.), Ethnic Constructs in Antiquity: The Role of Power and Tradition (Amsterdam: Amsterdam University Press, 2009) (Amsterdam Archaeological Studies, 13), 321–329.

External links

Fryske Akademy, the Frisian Academy 
Lex Frisionum in Latin, Dutch and English
History of the Frisian folk 

 
Geographic history of Denmark
German tribes
Ethnic groups divided by international borders
Germanic ethnic groups